The cabinet of the Netherlands has had female members since 1953. Anna de Waal served as the first female cabinet member as State Secretary for Education, Arts and Sciences appointed on 2 February 1953. Marga Klompé was the first female cabinet minister as Minister of Social Work appointed on 13 October 1956.

First holders

First holders in acting capacity

Second Drees cabinet

Third Drees cabinet

Second Beel cabinet

De Quay cabinet

Marijnen cabinet

Zijlstra cabinet

De Jong cabinet

First Biesheuvel cabinet

Den Uyl cabinet

First Van Agt cabinet

Second Van Agt cabinet

Third Van Agt cabinet

First Lubbers cabinet

Second Lubbers cabinet

Third Lubbers cabinet

First Kok cabinet

Second Kok cabinet

First Balkenende cabinet

Second Balkenende cabinet

Third Balkenende cabinet

Fourth Balkenende cabinet

First Rutte cabinet

Second Rutte cabinet

Third Rutte cabinet

Fourth Rutte cabinet

Netherlands
Woman
Women government ministers of the Netherlands